The 2018 New Zealand Derby was a horse race which took place at Ellerslie Racecourse on Saturday 3 March 2018. It was the 143rd running of the New Zealand Derby, and it was won by Vin De Dance.

Vin De Dance was offered at the New Zealand Bloodstock Ready to Run Sale as a two-year-old, but was passed in. A sale was later negotiated for $70,000, with breeder Luigi Muollo retaining a share alongside new owners OTI Racing and the Kilted Taniwha Syndicate.

The son of Roc de Cambes was sent to the Cambridge stable of Hall of Famer Murray Baker and his training partner Andrew Forsman. The team has won multiple New Zealand training premierships, and guided Mongolian Khan to victory in the 2015 New Zealand Derby.

Vin De Dance made a winning debut at Pukekohe in early September, then was placed in two subsequent appearances at Te Rapa. He was sent to Melbourne, where he finished third at Flemington and fifth in the Moonee Valley Vase.

Withdrawn from the Victoria Derby and given several months off to strengthen and develop, Vin De Dance returned with fourth and sixth placings over 1400 and 1600 metres in late January and early February. He moved into Derby contention with a fighting third in the Avondale Guineas.

The fifth favourite for the Derby at $9.90, Vin De Dance was handy throughout the 2400-metre race and loomed as a major threat around the home turn. He hit the lead inside the last 200 metres, but was joined by Mongolianconqueror in a desperate two-horse battle to the finish that Vin De Dance won by a nose.

OTI Racing's Terry Henderson described the New Zealand Derby win as the fulfilment of a long-held dream.

It was the first Derby win for jockey Jason Waddell.

Mongolianconqueror's trainers Stephen Autridge and Jamie Richards came up a mere nose short of winning the Derby two years in a row, having won the 2017 running with Gingernuts.

Race details
 Sponsor: Vodafone New Zealand
 Prize money: NZ$1,000,000
 Track: Good
 Number of runners: 18
 Winner's time: 2:28.44

Full result

Winner's details
Further details of the winner, Vin De Dance:

 Foaled: 13 September 2014
 Sire: Roc de Cambes; Dam: Explosive Dancer (San Luis)
 Owner: OTI Racing (Mgr: T Henderson), L Muollo & Kilted Taniwha Syndicate
 Trainer: Murray Baker & Andrew Forsman
 Breeder: Explosive Breeding Ltd (L Muollo)
 Starts: 9
 Wins: 2
 Seconds: 2
 Thirds: 2
 Earnings: $639,969

The road to the Derby
Early-season appearances in 2017-18 prior to running in the Derby.

 Vin De Dance – 5th Moonee Valley Vase, 3rd Avondale Guineas
 Mongolianconqueror – 2nd Waikato Guineas, 7th Avondale Guineas
 Danzdanzdance – 6th Karaka Million 3YO Classic, 2nd Avondale Guineas
 The Mayor – 6th Avondale Guineas
 Endowment – 2nd Auckland Guineas, 8th Avondale Guineas
 Mission Hill – 5th Avondale Guineas
 Civil Disobedience – 1st Tasmanian Derby
 On The Rocks – 1st Trevor Eagle Memorial, 3rd Auckland Guineas, 8th Karaka Million 3YO Classic, 1st Avondale Guineas
 Time Lord – 3rd Waikato Guineas
 Irish Flame – 3rd El Roca Trophy, 7th Hawke's Bay Guineas, 8th Sarten Memorial, 7th New Zealand 2000 Guineas, 13th Avondale Guineas
 Jimmy Rocket – 12th Waikato Guineas
 Secret Ambition – 10th Trevor Eagle Memorial, 3rd Auckland Salver, 17th Karaka Million 3YO Classic, 14th Avondale Guineas
 Maktoum – 7th Levin Classic, 5th Waikato Guineas
 Tavlin – 11th Waikato Guineas

Subsequent Group 1 wins
Subsequent wins at Group 1 level by runners in the 2018 New Zealand Derby.

 Danzdanzdance - 2018 Captain Cook Stakes, 2018 Zabeel Classic.
 On The Rocks - 2019 Herbie Dyke Stakes.

See also

 2020 New Zealand Derby
 2019 New Zealand Derby
 2017 New Zealand Derby
 2016 New Zealand Derby
 2015 New Zealand Derby
 2014 New Zealand Derby
 2013 New Zealand Derby
 2012 New Zealand Derby
 2011 New Zealand Derby
 2010 New Zealand Derby
  Recent winners of major NZ 3 year old races
 Desert Gold Stakes
 Hawke's Bay Guineas
 Karaka Million
 Levin Classic
 New Zealand 1000 Guineas
 New Zealand 2000 Guineas
 New Zealand Oaks

References

New Zealand Derby
2018 in New Zealand sport
New Zealand Derby
New Zealand Derby